The 2015 Challenge Cup Final was the 114th cup-deciding game of the rugby league 2015 Challenge Cup Season. It was held at Wembley Stadium in London on 29 August 2015, kick off 15:15. The final was contested by Hull KR and Leeds Rhinos. The game saw Leeds Rhinos beat Hull KR by 50 points to nil in what was, and remains, the worst defeat in Challenge Cup Final history.

Background
The 2015 Final was Hull KR's first final of the Super League era having last reached the final during the 1985–86 competition. In contrast, this was Leeds Rhinos's fifth final in the last six years having beat Castleford Tigers in the previous year's final and achieving runners up positions in the 2010, 2011, and 2012 editions of the competition. In terms of the domestic league Hull KR were relegation threatened having entered the qualifiers where was Leeds Rhinos would be the eventual champions, both in terms of the Grand Final and the League Leaders.

Route to the final

Hull KR
As a team that did not quality for the 2014 Super League Super 8's, Hull KR entered the competition in the fifth round which saw them draw Championship leaders Bradford Bulls. A 50–30 victory saw them play eventual Super League runners-up Wigan Warriors, beating them 16 points to 12. The quarter finals and semi-finals saw KR play midtable teams Catalans Dragons and Warrington Wolves, beating them by six and eight points respectively.

Leeds Rhinos
Entering in at the sixth round, Leeds drew Super League title rivals Huddersfield Giants to whom the saw a comfortable victory by 32 points. The quarter finals saw them beat Hull F.C. 24 points to six, before facing another title rival, St Helens, in the semi-finals, beating them 24 points to 14.

Pre-match
The 2014 Britain's Got Talent winners Collabro provided musical entertainment prior to the match. The pre-match also saw a tribute to Danny Jones who died of a cardiac disease earlier in the season whist playing for Keighley Cougars. His widow, singer Lizzie Jones, would sing Abide with Me before the game.

Match details

Post match
Leeds Rhinos beat their own record of the largest win margin during a Challenge Cup Final. They previous set the record during the 1999 Challenge Cup Final where they beat London Broncos 52 points to 16.

This Challenge Cup victory would form part of Leeds Rhinos's treble winning season, becoming only the sixth team in British Rugby to achieve this feat. The treble season would mark club captain Kevin Sinfield's retirement from the sport after first captaining the club to win the remaining two trophies of the treble.

References

Challenge Cup finals
Hull Kingston Rovers
Leeds Rhinos matches
2015 sports events in London
August 2015 sports events in the United Kingdom